Mariam Ndagire Film and Performing Arts Centre is a Uganda-based training film initiative for emerging filmmakers and mentorship programme for aspiring filmmakers and youth in Uganda. It encompasses film production, screenwriting, directing, producing, cinematography, editing, sound recording, and acting.

Origins 
MNFPAC was established in 2010 by film producer and singer Mariam Ndagire. MNFPAC aims at improving and elevating Uganda's entertainment industry through nurturing committed, honest and disciplined artistes.

Notable alumnus 
Usama Mukwaya
Doreen Mirembe
Nkalubo Rhonnie Abraham
Kenneth Mugerwa
Laura Kahunde
Nabagereka Faridah

References 

Film organisations in Uganda